Kleine Müritz is a lake in Mecklenburg-Vorpommern, Germany. At an elevation of 62.1 m, its surface area is 4 km².

Lakes of Mecklenburg-Western Pomerania